Rhytida greenwoodi is a species of medium-sized, air-breathing predatory land snail, a terrestrial pulmonate gastropod mollusc in the family Rhytididae.

Subspecies 
 Rhytida greenwoodi greenwoodi (Gray, 1950) North Island
 Rhytida greenwoodi stephenensis Powell, 1930 Stephens Island, Cook Strait
 Rhytida greenwoodi webbi Powell, 1949 South Island

Distribution 
This species occurs in New Zealand

Ecology 

Dimensions of eggs of Rhytida greenwoodi are 3.25 × 2.73, 3 × 2.8, 2.75 × 2.5, 3.5 × 2.75, 5 × 4, 4 × 3, 3.75 × 3, 4.75 × 4, 4.75 × 3.75, 4.75 × 3.5 mm.

References

Rhytida
Gastropods described in 1850
Taxa named by John Edward Gray
Gastropods of New Zealand
Endemic fauna of New Zealand
Endemic molluscs of New Zealand